The Texas Tech Red Raiders football statistical leaders are individual statistical leaders of the Texas Tech Red Raiders football program in various categories, including passing, rushing, receiving, total offense, defensive stats, and kicking. Within those areas, the lists identify single-game, single-season and career leaders. The Red Raiders represent Texas Tech University in the NCAA's Big 12 Conference.

Texas Tech began competing in intercollegiate football in 1925. These lists are dominated by more recent players for several reasons:
 Since 1950, seasons have increased from 9 games to 10, 11 and then 12 games in length.
 The NCAA didn't allow freshmen to play varsity football until 1972 (with the exception of the World War II years), allowing players to have four-year careers.
 Bowl games only began counting toward single-season and career statistics in 2002. The Red Raiders have played in a bowl game in all but two seasons since 2002.
 Since 2000, the Red Raiders have run a high-octane air raid offense under head coaches Mike Leach, Tommy Tubberville, and Kliff Kingsbury. The passing and receiving lists are dominated by players from this era, although the rushing lists are not.

The statistics below are updated through the 2021 season.

Passing

Passing Yards

Passing Touchdowns

Rushing

Rushing Yards

Rushing Touchdowns

Receiving

Receptions

Receiving Yards

Receiving Touchdowns

Total offense
Total offense is the sum of passing and rushing statistics. It does not include receiving or returns.

Total offense yards

Total touchdowns

Defense

Interceptions

Tackles

Sacks

Kicking

Field goals made

Field goal percentage

References

Lists of college football statistical leaders by team
Statistical Leaders